Citrus (stylized as citrus) is a Japanese yuri manga series written and illustrated by Saburouta. It was serialized in Ichijinsha's Comic Yuri Hime from November 2012 to August 2018 and is licensed in English by Seven Seas Entertainment. A 12-episode anime television series adaptation by Passione aired from January to March 2018. A sequel manga titled Citrus Plus began serialization in December 2018.

Plot
Yuzu Aihara, a fashionable, spontaneous and fun-loving city girl, transfers to a new neighborhood and high school after her mother's remarriage to another man. More preoccupied with boys and shopping than studying, Yuzu struggles to fit in at the conservative all-girls school and frequently clashes with the student council, specifically Mei Aihara, the hard-working, beautiful but cold student council president. As it turns out, Mei happens to be Yuzu's new stepsister and Yuzu finds herself having to share a bedroom with a girl she absolutely cannot stand. The series follows the evolution of the relationship between the two girls, with the animosity slowly lessening as the two begin to learn more about each other and confusion growing as Yuzu discovers that she is starting to develop romantic feelings for her new stepsister.

Characters

Main characters

Yuzu is a self-proclaimed gyaru and Mei Aihara's older stepsister. Her father died when she was very young. She dyes her hair blonde, and has green eyes. She is a daring, outspoken, and often shameless only child who transfers to an all-girls school (Aihara Academy) after her mother gets remarried. She enjoys dressing up, wearing makeup and customizing her school uniform in ways that clash with her school's code of conduct, often leading to altercations with the student council. Although her former friends believed her to be quite experienced in dating and relationships, she confesses she has never had a boyfriend.

Mei is the beautiful and serious Student Council President, honor student, school chairman's granddaughter, and Yuzu's younger stepsister. She is stern, cold and composed, but has a short temper. Although greatly respected by the student body, she may on occasion act or speak cruelly. This trait, as well as the fact that Mei often makes sexual advances toward her simply to manipulate her, greatly frustrates Yuzu.

Although she has adapted to fit in at the school, Harumi was also a transfer and is quite different from the conservative girls around her, taking no interest in fawning over Mei. She often breaks the school rules by taking her phone to school and going out after school hours. She is perky, kind, perceptive, humorous, easy-going and an overall good friend towards Yuzu, often lending her comfort and aide in the wake of the ups and downs of Yuzu's life. She often packs many items within her cleavage, and she has an older sister whom she is slightly fearful of.

Aihara Academy

Himeko is the Student Council vice-president and Mei's childhood friend and current right hand. She is from a very wealthy family, having a chauffeur and at least one butler. On weekends she can be seen wearing lolita fashion. She is stern, forward and jealous, and has quite a volatile personality. She is in love with Mei and is very possessive of her, becoming jealous when Yuzu enters her life. She has a small dog named Pucchi.

A member of the Student Council, a shy second-year student who is very close to Harumi's sister Mitsuko, being the original vice-president before Mitsuko left the school. She was shown to constantly mock Mitsuko for being immature and scaring Harumi away, but ultimately has a crush on Mitsuko.

Shō's father and Mei's grandfather, who disliked Yuzu at first due to her breaking his school's rules and expelled her after walking in on Mei sexually assaulting Yuzu, assuming Yuzu was the one attacking. He later pardons her after she saves his life by calling him an ambulance after she finds him collapsed. Mei has taken Chairman duties until he returns.

 
Nene is an energetic first year who looks to Yuzu as a role model; an inspiration to become braver and speaking up. It is later revealed that she is also an intense yuri shipper, specifically of Yuzu and Harumi. She is grateful of Yuzu and the others for having accepted her, even after all of the trouble she unintentionally caused them.

 
Suzuran is an extremely observant and unflappable third-year of Aihara Academy. She has an immense infatuation for Mei, for she is the only person that she cannot read. Consequently, she spends all of her free time observing her, thus why she is in need of summer supplementary lessons. Suzuran comes from a rich family who refrain from expressing emotions in order to not be taken advantage of by others. She also has an older stepbrother.

Sayaka is a strict yet calm first-year student and member of the student council. She dislikes the new rules at the academy, believing that people take advantage of them and questions Mei's leadership. She is close friends with fellow first-year Miyabi Sakuraba. She struggles to believe that two girls can fall in love with each other.

Miyabi is a kind first-year student council member who compassionately listens to her friend Sayaka, who she had known from middle school. She is a warm and friendly person open to trying new things such as falling in love. She does not mind the new school rules and does not think love between two girls is impossible, contrary to her friend Sayaka.

Others

Kana is Yuzu's friends since middle school. She lost contact with Yuzu when Yuzu transferred schools, but she met her again while working part-time back in her old city. 

Manami is Yuzu's friends since middle school. She lost contact with Yuzu when Yuzu transferred schools, but she met her again while working part-time back in her old city. 

He is Mei's divorced father and Yuzu's stepfather.

She is Yuzu's widowed mother and Mei's stepmother.

A homeroom teacher at Aihara Academy. He was Mei's fiancé until he gets fired from the school after Yuzu revealed his behavior in front of the entire school.

Matsuri is the older sister of Inori, whose parents are always working and do not really pay attention to them. She is Yuzu's childhood friend who lived close to her before she moved to the Aihara residence, and a second-year in middle school. Matsuri is precocious and smart for her age, and does not mind her words. She can be mischievous at times and she enjoys teasing people, especially Yuzu and Harumi. Like Mei, she tends to be manipulative. She sells masturbation videos she finds on the Internet to old men through a phone app, pretending they are hers, as a means of income. She eventually develops feelings for Harumi, even claiming to be her girlfriend.

Sara is a student from a different school. She falls in love with Mei at first sight, but after finding out about her relationship with Yuzu, she gives up on Mei in order to support their love. Sara is very superstitious and ardently believes in things such as luck and destiny. She is very short, and has a younger twin sister named Nina.

She is Sara's younger twin sister, who happens to be much taller. She is a skeptical and does not believe in fate. She worries very much for her Sara, so she tried to help her and Mei getting together, and tried to prevent Yuzu from getting in their way.

 
The older sister of Harumi Taniguchi. She is the former Student Council President of Aihara Academy. She was very close to Kayo, who still remains a part of the student council to this very day, when she was still in the academy.

A school friend of Nina and Sara. She seems to have been the one to introduce Nina to Momoiro Shimai, and is also the school's Student Council President, being the complete opposite of Mei at that.

The manager of the café where Yuzu worked part-time for some time in order to buy her a ring. Despite not knowing who is Yuzu's lover, he supports their relationship. It is revealed that he was Mei's fiancé, for a short time. 

Inori is Matsuri's younger brother.

Media

Manga
Citrus, written and illustrated by Saburouta, was serialized in Ichijinsha's bimonthly magazine Comic Yuri Hime from November 17, 2012 to August 18, 2018. Ichijinsha published ten tankōbon volumes from July 18, 2013 to October 31, 2018. To advertise the third volume of the manga, a PV covering the story up to that point was uploaded to Ichijinsha's YouTube channel on November 18, 2014. A drama CD was released with the fourth manga volume on July 18, 2015. The manga is licensed in North America by Seven Seas Entertainment, who published the series from December 16, 2014 to July 23, 2019. It has also been licensed in Germany, Thailand, and Taiwan.

A sequel manga series, Citrus Plus (stylized as citrus+), launched on December 18, 2018. The series is also licensed in North America by Seven Seas Entertainment.

Volume list

Citrus

Citrus Plus

Anime
An anime television series adaptation, directed by Takeo Takahashi and animated by Passione, aired on AT-X from January 6 to March 24, 2018. Naoki Hayashi oversaw the scripts, while Izuro Ijuuin was in charge of designing the characters. Lantis produced the music, while Infinite was credited with producing the anime. Crunchyroll simulcasted the series, while Funimation streamed the English dub. Following Sony's acquisition of Crunchyroll, the dub was moved to Crunchyroll. The series was released on Blu-ray Disc in North America on January 22, 2019 and in Australia on May 8, 2019.

Reception
Citrus appeared on The New York Times best seller list for manga five times in 2015. In a review of the manga's first volume by Rebecca Silverman of Anime News Network, Citrus is described as having emotionally interesting characters with the contrasting personalities of Yuzu and Mei, and their relationship is likened to a "yuri version of the twins' from Arisa." Silverman praises Saburouta's use of reader hindsight, pointing out that Mei's actions can be seen in a different light as the series progresses due to Saburouta giving a slow understanding of her character. However, the non-consensual elements of the manga are described as uncomfortable in contrast with gentler yuri manga that have previously been released in English.

Juliana Failde of CBR also criticized the series, calling it problematic because it has "strange sexual assault" between two people (Mei and Yuzu) in a "horribly toxic relationship" with each other, and called the romance "poorly executed." Failde further stated that the series had an "inappropriate" sibling relationship where "two step-sisters fall for each other after a forced kiss." The founder of Yuricon and writer of Okazu, Erica Friedman, criticized the series as well for trying to present "sexual assault [as] amusing," and called it insensitive to the Me Too movement. Vrai Kaiser of Anime Feminist cited its effectiveness as a melodrama, but found the non-consensual physical contact between Yuzu and Mei to be uncomfortable, adding that the discomfort is heightened by how these specific elements "seem to make it popular above and beyond other yuri series." Nicoletta Christina Browne of THEM Anime Reviews has argued that Sara, is pansexual, demisexual, or even bisexual, but that the series never fully explored this.

Notes

References

External links
Anime official website 

2010s LGBT literature
2012 manga
Anime series based on manga
AT-X (TV network) original programming
Crunchyroll anime
Gyaru in fiction
Ichijinsha manga
Japanese LGBT-related animated television series
Medialink
Passione (company)
School life in anime and manga
Seven Seas Entertainment titles
Yuri (genre) anime and manga